Neopalame is a genus of beetles in the family Cerambycidae.

Species
The genus includes the following species:

 Neopalame albida Monné, 1985
 Neopalame albomaculata Monné & Martins, 1976
 Neopalame atromaculata Monné & Martins, 1976
 Neopalame cretata Monné & Delfino, 1980
 Neopalame deludens Monné, 1985
 Neopalame digna (Melzer, 1935)

References

Acanthocinini